John Bertram Wood, better known as Jack Wood (20 October 1872 – 10 October 1921), was an English footballer and referee. He is best known for being the fundamental head behind the foundation of French club White Rovers in 1891, one of the first football clubs in Paris, and then serving the club as captain between 1891 and 1896. He then became a referee and officiated at the football tournament of the 1900 Summer Olympics, in which he oversaw a match between the representative sides of France and Belgium. He also refereed a match between the official sides of those two nations on 22 April 1906.

His brother Tom also played for White Rovers.

Biography
Born in Tottenham in 1872, he began to play football in North London. In October 1891, when he arrived in Paris to continue his education, one of his first priorities was to form a football club in the French capital (since there was practically none at the time), so he could organize and play football in his new home. Within a few months of his arrival in his new country, Jack Wood and his brother Tom, together with other football pioneers in the city, mostly made up of Anglo-British and Americans, formed the White Rovers Football Club after a meeting at the Café Français on rue Pasquier in Paris, where they voted narrowly to play association football rather than rugby rules, thus founding one of the first football club in Paris. They were named the White Rovers because of the white shirts they wore.

White Rovers was one of the most important clubs in the amateur beginnings of football in France, being one of the six football clubs that participated in France's first-ever football championship in 1894, in which they faced Standard AC in the final, but despite Wood captaining by example and scoring once in a 2–2 draw, the Rovers ended as runners-up after losing the replay 0–2.

Wood also played for Standard AC and Club Français, before retiring and becoming a referee. He officiated in one of the only two games at the 1900 Paris Olympics, between a French side represented by USFSA and a Belgian side made up almost entirely of students of the University of Brussels, which ended in a 6–2 win for the French side.

He was also in charge of the 1902 USFSA Football Championship final between RC Roubaix and RC de France, which ended in a 3–3 draw, so he decided to play extra-time for 15 minutes. However, the winning goal was only scored in the sixth extra-time, after nearly three hours of play. He also referred the 1903 Coupe Dewar Final, in which US Suisse Paris beat Club Français 4–3 after extra time. He also oversaw the final of the 1905 USFSA Football Championship between Gallia Club Paris and RC Roubaix, which ended in a 1–o win to the former. Wood refereed his first and last international match on 22 April 1906, in a meeting between France and Belgium at Stade Français, ending in a 5–0 win to the latter.

References

1872 births
1921 deaths
English footballers
Association football midfielders
English football referees
Olympic football referees
English referees and umpires
English expatriate sportspeople in France
Expatriate footballers in France
English expatriate footballers